Ein Fall für die Anrheiner is a German television series.

See also
Die Anrheiner (1998 – 2011)
List of German television series

External links
 

2011 German television series debuts
2014 German television series endings
German-language television shows
Television shows set in Cologne
Sequel television series
Das Erste original programming